North Beach is a compilation album by American jazz pianist Vince Guaraldi (credited to Vince Guaraldi and Friends) released by D & D Records (Guaraldi's label) in January 2006. The album is a mix of previously unreleased studio and live recordings taped in mid-1970s.

Background
In the mid-2000s, Vince Guaraldi's son, David Guaraldi, worked to restore a wealth of unreleased live recorded material from his father's archives. The recordings on North Beach were taped in a variety of studios and jazz clubs based in the North Beach region of San Francisco, California.

The release features covers of Elton John's "Your Song" and Frank Sinatra's "It Was a Very Good Year".

North Beach was released on CD only. It did not receive a vinyl release.

Track listing

"Cast Your Fate to the Wind", "Linus and Lucy" and "Cabaret" were re-released on Live on the Air (2008).

Session information

"Cast Your Fate to the Wind" (live)
Written by Vince Guaraldi
Piano, Fender Rhodes: Vince Guaraldi
Electric bass: Seward McCain
Drums: Eliot Zigmund
Recorded on February 6, 1974, Wally Heider Studios, San Francisco, California; live broadcast on radio stations KPFA and KPFB

"Autumn Leaves"
Written by Joseph Kosma
Piano: Vince Guaraldi
Bass: Ron McClure
Drums: Mike Clark
Recorded on October 8, 1973

"Your Song"
Written by Elton John and Bernie Taupin
Piano, Fender Rhodes, ARP String Ensemble: Vince Guaraldi
Recorded on November 20, 1975, Wally Heider Studios, San Francisco, California; sidemen unspecified

"Lucifer's Lady" (live)
Written by Vince Guaraldi
Piano: Vince Guaraldi
Session information unknown

"It Was a Very Good Year" (live)
Written by Ervin Drake
Piano: Vince Guaraldi
Session information unknown

"Linus and Lucy" (live)
Written by Vince Guaraldi
Piano: Vince Guaraldi
Electric bass: Seward McCain
Drums: Eliot Zigmund
Recorded on February 6, 1974, Wally Heider Studios, San Francisco, California; live broadcast on radio stations KPFA and KPFB

"Cabaret" (live)
Written by Fred Ebb and John Kander
Piano, Fender Rhodes: Vince Guaraldi
Electric bass: Seward McCain
Drums: Eliot Zigmund
Recorded on February 6, 1974, Wally Heider Studios, San Francisco, California; live broadcast on radio stations KPFA and KPFB

"The Masked Marvel"
Written by Vince Guaraldi
Piano: Vince Guaraldi
Guitar: Eddie Duran
Bass: Kelly Bryan
Drums: Al Coster
Recorded in mid-to-late October 1969

"Cast Your Fate to the Wind" (live)
Written by Vince Guaraldi
Piano, Fender Rhodes: Vince Guaraldi
Session information unavailable; most likely recorded January 1976

Personnel
 David Guaraldi – producer, liner notes 
 Michael Graves – engineer (audio restoration)
 Russell Bond – mastering

References

2006 compilation albums
2006 live albums
Albums arranged by Vince Guaraldi
Vince Guaraldi albums
Cool jazz compilation albums
Mainstream jazz compilation albums
Vince Guaraldi live albums
Vince Guaraldi compilation albums
Peanuts music